Maureen Seaton (born October 20, 1947 in Elizabeth, New Jersey) is an American LGBTQ poet, activist, and professor of English/Creative Writing at the University of Miami.  She is the author of fourteen solo books of poetry, thirteen co-authored books of poetry, and her memoir, Sex Talks to Girls.  Throughout her writing career, Seaton has often collaborated with fellow poets Denise Duhamel, Neil de la Flor, Kristine Snodgrass, and Samuel Ace.

Background 
Seaton received her MFA in Creative Writing/Poetry from Vermont College of Fine Arts in 1996. She moved with her family from the Bronx to Chicago in 1992 and taught poetry workshops and served as Artist-in-Residence at Columbia College Chicago from 1993-2002, teaching concurrently in the MFA in Creative Writing program at the School of the Art Institute of Chicago from 1997-1999. In 2002 she moved to Florida and joined the faculty in creative writing at the University of Miami. She was voted Miami’s Best Poet by the Miami New Times in 2020.

Books

Solo work

Poetry 
Undersea. Jackleg Press, 2021.
Sweet World. CavanKerry Press, 2019.
Fisher. Black Lawrence Press, 2018.
Tit, with Blue Guitar. Dancing Girl Press (chapbook), 2016.
Fibonacci Batman: New and Selected Poems (1991-2011).  Carnegie Mellon University Press, 2013.
Genetics.  Jackleg Press, 2012.
Cave of the Yellow Volkswagen.  Carnegie Mellon University Press, 2009.
America Loves Carney.  Sow's Ear (chapbook), 2009.
Venus Examines Her Breast.  Carnegie Mellon University Press, 2004.
Little Ice Age.  Invisible City Press, 2001.
Miss Molly Rockin'.  Thorngate Road (chapbook), 1998.
Furious Cooking.  University of Iowa Press, 1996.
The Sea Among the Cupboards.  New Rivers Press, 1992.  
Fear of Subways.  The Eighth Mountain Press, 1991.

Prose 
 Sex Talks to Girls: A Memoir. University of Wisconsin Press, 2008, 2018.

Co-authored poetry 
 A Questionnaire for Two Pussies. Extra Virgin Press, 2021 (chapbook, with Denise Duhamel).
Zero-Zero. Hysterical Press, 2021 (chapbook, with Kristine Snodgrass).
Myth America: Poems in Collaboration, by Tres Abuelas y una Mamá. Anhinga Press, 2020 (chapbook, with Carolina Hospital, Nicole Hospital-Medina, and Holly Iglesias).
Road to the Multiverse. Ravenna Press (Triple Series #11), 2020 (chapbook, with Samuel Ace).
Caprice: Collected, Uncollected, and New Collaborations. Sibling Rivalry Press, 2015 (with Denise Duhamel).
Madame Curie’s Cookbook. Ravenna Press, 2014. (pamphlet, with Samuel Ace).
 Two Thieves & a Liar. Jackleg Press, 2012 (with Neil de la Flor & Kristine Snodgrass).
 Sinéad O'Connor and Her Coat of a Thousand Bluebirds. Firewheel Editions, 2011 (with Neil de la Flor).
 Stealth, Chax Press. 2011 (with Samuel Ace).
 Facial Geometry. NeoPepper Press, 2006 (chapbook, with Neil de la Flor & Kristine Snodgrass).
 Little Novels. Pearl Editions, 2002 (chapbook, with Denise Duhamel).
 Oyl. Pearl Editions, 2000 (chapbook, with Denise Duhamel).
 Exquisite Politics. Tia Chucha Press, 1997 (with Denise Duhamel).

Co-edited
 Reading Queer:  Poetry in a Time of Chaos. Anhinga, 2018 (with Neil de la Flor).
 Saints of Hysteria: A Half-Century of Collaborative American Poetry. Soft Skull Press, 2007 (with Denise Duhamel & David Trinidad).

Awards and honors 
 2020 Miami New Times' Miami's Best Poet
2020 RHINO 2020's Editors' Prize ("4th Stage Metaphoric Breast Cancer").
2019 Florida Book Award for Poetry (Sweet World)
2015 The Best Small Fictions ("This Kind of Life Keeps Breaking")
 2015 Fellow, U.S. National Parks, Devils Tower National Monument, Wyoming
 2013 Best American Poetry ("Chelsea/Suicide")
 2011 Sentence Book Award for Sinéad O'Connor and Her Coat of a Thousand Bluebirds (with Neil de la Flor)
 2009 Winner, Sow's Ear Chapbook Competition for America Loves Carney
 2008 Lambda Literary Award for Lesbian Memoir for Sex Talks to Girls
 2005 Fellow, The Hermitage, Sarasota Arts Council, Manasota Key, FL
 2005 Publishing Triangle's Audre Lorde Award for Lesbian Poetry for Venus Examines Her Breast
 2001 Illinois Arts Council Literary Award (with Rhino) for "Toy Weather"
 2001 Fellow, Ragdale Foundation, Lake Forest, IL
 1998 Pushcart Prize in Poetry for "LA Dream #2"
 1998 Illinois Arts Council Literary Award (with Spoon River Poetry Review) for "Confession"
 1997 Fellow, Ragdale Foundation, Lake Forest, IL
 1997 Best American Poetry ("Fiddleheads")
 1997 Poetry Society of America & Illinois Arts Council, "A Chorus of Horizontals" appeared on Chicago  subways and buses as a part of "Poetry in Motion." 
 1997 Illinois Arts Council Literary Award (with Another Chicago Magazine) for "Genetics"
 1996 Pushcart Prize in Poetry for "Theories of Illusion"
 1996 Lambda Literary Award for Lesbian Poetry for Furious Cooking
 1996 Illinois Arts Council Literary Award (with Chicago Review) for "A Chorus of Horizontals"
 1995 Iowa Poetry Prize for Furious Cooking 
 1995 Fellow, Ragdale Foundation, Lake Forest, IL
 1994 Editors' Prize in Poetry (The Missouri Review)
 1994 Illinois Arts Council Grant
 1994 National Endowment of the Arts, Creative Writing Fellowship in Poetry
 1994 Fellow, Ragdale Foundation, Lake Forest, IL
 1993 The Society of Midland Authors Award for The Sea among the Cupboards
 1993 Fellow, Ragdale Foundation, Lake Forest, IL
 1992 The Capricorn Award for Poetry for The Sea among the Cupboards
 1991 McAfee Discovery Award (The Missouri Review)
 1990 The Eighth Mountain Press Poetry Prize for Fear of Subways
 1987 Fellow, Ucross Foundation, Ucross, Wyoming

References 

1947 births
Living people
American LGBT poets
American lesbian writers
American feminist writers
20th-century American poets
University of Miami faculty
21st-century American poets
American women poets
Writers from Elizabeth, New Jersey
Vermont College of Fine Arts alumni
Lambda Literary Award for Lesbian Poetry winners
21st-century American women writers
20th-century American women writers
LGBT people from New Jersey
Lesbian memoirists
American women academics